The Glasgow Stock Exchange is a prominent building and former financial institution in the centre of the city of Glasgow, Scotland.

The exchange was founded in 1844. In 1973, it merged with the London Stock Exchange.  the building is occupied by shops, government and other offices.

The current building was erected between 1875 and 1877. It is situated on the corner of Nelson Mandela Place (prior to 1986 known as St George's Place) and Buchanan Street, was designed by John Burnet in the Venetian Gothic style, believed to have been inspired by the Royal Courts of Justice. In 1906, an extension was added in St George's Place and the entire building was remodelled between 1969 and 1971. The structure is now protected as a category A listed building.

References

See also
 Edinburgh Stock Exchange

1844 establishments in Scotland
Buildings and structures in Glasgow
Economy of Glasgow
Economy of Scotland
Organisations based in Glasgow
Venetian Gothic architecture in the United Kingdom

Category A listed buildings in Glasgow
Organizations established in 1844
1973 disestablishments in Scotland
Financial services in Scotland
Commercial buildings completed in 1877
1877 in Scotland
Former stock exchanges in the United Kingdom